

The Hunza–Nagar Campaign was fought in 1891 by troops of the British Raj against the princely states of Hunza and Nagar in the Gilgit Agency (now part of the Gilgit-Baltistan of Pakistan). It is also known in Pakistan as the "Anglo-Brusho War".

British Colonel Algernon George Arnold Durand was appointed administrator of the Gilgit Agency. He opened up the region by building roads, telegraph, and mail systems while maintaining dialogue with the Mir of Gilgit. He intended to improve the road from Kashmir through Hunza and Nagar and up to the frontier with Russia. The Mirs of Nagar and Hunza saw this as a threat to their natural advantage of remoteness.

In 1890, Durand reinforced Chalt Fort that was near the border in response to rumors that Nagar and Hunza fighters were going to attack it; he then continued redeveloping the road leading up to the fort. In May 1891, Nagar and Hunza sent a warning to Durand to cease working on the road to the fort and to vacate the fort, which was on the Gilgit side of the border, else they would regard it as an act of war. Durand nonetheless reinforced the fort and accelerated the construction of the road. Nagar and Hunza regarded Durand's actions as an escalation and consequently prevented mail from the British Resident in Chinese Turkmenistan from transiting through their territory. British India regarded this as a breach of their 1889 agreement with Hunza and after issuing an ultimatum that was ignored, they initiated the Anglo-Brusho Campaign of 1891. Hunza and Nagar later came under a British protectorate in 1893.

During the campaign, Durand commanded a force of approximately one thousand rifles and two guns.  The British gained control of Nagar during a battle at Nilt Nagar (Jangir-e-Laye) in 1891. The fort at Nilt was stormed and after a fortnight's delay, the cliffs beyond it were also carried by assault. Hunza and Nagar were occupied, the chief of Nagar was reinstated upon his submission to the British, and the half-brother of the raja of Hunza was installed as chief of Hunza.

The British awarded three Victoria Crosses during this campaign.

See also
Francis Younghusband
The Great Game

References

Further reading
 
Edward Frederick Knight, Where Three Empires Meet: A Narrative of Recent Travel in Kashmir, Western Tibet, Gilgit, and the Adjoining Countries (1893) Longmans, Green, and Co. - The author was a volunteer participant in the campaign, and the back half of the book contains a detailed description
John Keay, The Gilgit Game: The Explorers of the Western Himalayas 1865-95 (1994) Oxford University Press
  
Charles Welsh (editor), Famous Battles of the Nineteenth Century, (1905), (Wessels).

External links
Francis Younghusband

Conflicts in 1891
Battles involving British India
1891 in Asia
1891 in India
History of Gilgit Agency